Plain clothes may refer to:

 Plainclothes law enforcement
Plain Clothes (1925 film), a silent black and white short American film
 Plain Clothes (1988 film), an American comedy film
 Plain Clothes Theatre Productions, a theatre company based in Bristol, England
 Plainclothes (TV series), a 1990s New Zealand crime drama series
 Plain dress, a religious practice of wearing clothes of traditional, modest design